The Texas Senate is the upper house of the Texas State Legislature. There are 31 members of the Senate, representing single-member districts across the U.S. state of Texas, with populations of approximately 806,000 per constituency, based on the 2010 U.S. Census. There are no term limits, and each term is four years long. Elections are held in even-numbered years on the first Tuesday after the first Monday in November. In elections in years ending in 2, all seats are up for election. Half of the senators will serve a two-year term, based on a drawing; the other half will fill regular four-year terms. In the case of the latter, they or their successors will be up for two-year terms in the next year that ends in 0. As such, in other elections, about half of the Texas Senate is on the ballot. The Senate meets at the Texas State Capitol in Austin. The Republicans currently control the chamber, which is made up of 19 Republicans and 12 Democrats.

Leadership
The Lieutenant Governor of Texas serves as the President of the Senate. Unlike most lieutenant governors who are constitutionally designated as presiding officers of the upper house, the Lieutenant Governor regularly exercises this function. The Lieutenant Governor's duties include appointing chairs of committees, committee members, assigning and referring bills to specific committees, recognizing members during debate, and making procedural rulings. The Lieutenant Governor may also cast a vote should a Senate floor vote end in a tie.  If the Senate votes to dissolve itself into the Committee of the Whole, in which all members are part of the Committee, the President Pro-Tempore presides over the proceedings, with the Lieutenant Governor acting as a regular voting member.  Due to the various powers of committee selection and bill assignment, the Lieutenant Governor of Texas is considered one of the most powerful lieutenant governorships in the United States.

Unlike other state legislatures, the Texas Senate does not include majority or minority leaders. Instead, the President Pro Tempore is considered the second most powerful position, and can be reserved to any political party in the chamber regardless if the party is a majority or not. Presidents Pro Tempore are usually the most senior members of the Senate. The President Pro Tempore presides when the Lieutenant Governor is not present or when the legislature is not in regular session.

Leaders

History

Quorum-busting

There have been at least three cases of quorum-busting in Texas Senate history. The first case was in 1870, with the Rump Senate, followed by the 1979 Killer Bees and finally the "Texas Eleven" in August 2003 during the controversial mid-decade redistricting plan at the time.

Committee structure
The following represents the Senate committee structure for the 86th Legislature.

Administration
Agriculture
Business & Commerce
Criminal Justice
Education
Finance
Health & Human Services
Higher Education
Intergovernmental Relations
Natural Resources & Economic Development
Nominations
Property Tax
State Affairs
Transportation
Veteran Affairs & Border Security
Water & Rural Affairs

In addition, the House and Senate operate the permanent joint committee known as the Legislative Budget Board (LBB).

Current composition

List of members

†Elected in a special election

Notable past members

 Edward Clark, Lieutenant Governor of Texas (1859–1861), Governor of Texas (1861).
 Wayne Connally, Senator from Wilson County (1967–1973), brother of Governor John Connally.
 Lloyd Doggett, Texas Supreme Court Justice (1989–1994), U.S. House of Representatives (1995–present).
 Robert L. Duncan, State Senator from Lubbock, 1996–2014; Chancellor of the Texas Tech University System since 2014
 Chet Edwards, U.S. House of Representatives (1991–2011).
 James W. Flanagan, U.S. Senate (1870–1875).
 Glenn Hegar, current Texas Comptroller of Public Accounts (2015–present).
 John Ireland, Texas Supreme Court Justice (1876), Governor of Texas (1883–1887).
 Eddie Bernice Johnson, U.S. House of Representatives (1993–2023).
 Rienzi Melville Johnston, U.S. Senate (1913).
 Barbara Jordan, U.S. House of Representatives (1973–1979).
 Earle Bradford Mayfield, U.S. Senate (1923–1929).
 William Neff "Bill" Patman, Senator from Jackson County (1961–1981), U.S. House of Representatives (1981–1985).
 Dan Patrick, current Lieutenant Governor of Texas (2015–present).
 Jerry E. Patterson, Commissioner of the Texas General Land Office (2003–2015).
 Lawrence Sullivan Ross, Governor of Texas, (1887–1891).
 Joseph D. Sayers, Lieutenant Governor of Texas (1879–1881), U.S. House of Representatives (1885–1899), Governor of Texas (1899–1903).
 Allan Shivers, Lieutenant Governor of Texas (1946–1949), Governor of Texas (1949–1957).
 Preston Smith, Governor of Texas (1969–1973).
 Frank Tejeda, U.S. House of Representatives (1993–1997).
 James W. Throckmorton, Governor of Texas (1866–1867), U.S. House of Representatives (1875–1879, 1883–1887).
 Carlos Truan, Senator from Corpus Christi (1977–2003); author of Texas Bilingual Education Act.
 Jim Turner, U.S. House of Representatives (1997–2005).
 Matthias Ward, U.S. Senate (1858–1859).
 Ferdinand C. Weinert, Texas House and Texas Senate (1893–1935), Texas Secretary of State (1913).
 Louis Wigfall, U.S. Senate (1859–1861).
 Charles Wilson, U.S. House of Representatives (1973–1997).

Past composition of the Senate 

The Senate was continuously held by Democrats from the end of the Reconstruction era until the Seventy-fifth Texas Legislature was seated in 1997, at which point Republicans took control. The Republican Party has maintained its control of the Senate since then.

See also

 Texas Legislature
 Texas House of Representatives
 List of Presidents pro tempore of the Texas Senate
 Texas Government Newsletter Voting History of the Texas Legislature.

References

External links

Official Texas Senate website

 
 01
 01
.
Government of Texas
State upper houses in the United States